Superfamily may refer to:
Protein superfamily
 Superfamily database
 Superfamily (taxonomy), a taxonomic rank
 Superfamily (linguistics), also known as macrofamily
 Font superfamily, a large typographic family
 Superfamily (band), a Norwegian pop band
 "Super Family", a group of comic characters